Asnuntuck Community College (ACC) is a public community college in Enfield, Connecticut.  It offers associate degree and certificate programs as well as healthcare certificate programs and business and industry programming.

History

Asnuntuck Community College was established in 1972 as the twelfth institution in the Connecticut State Colleges and Universities system (CSCU). Classes began in 1972 with an initial enrollment of 251, and 12 Associate in Science degrees and 20 Associate of Art degrees were awarded to the first graduating class in 1974. The college operated under provisional approval until it was first accredited by the New England Association of Schools and Colleges in 1977. Asnuntuck was subsequently reaccredited after comprehensive reviews in 1980 and 1985; an interim report was submitted to the New England Association in 1990, and accreditation was reaffirmed through 1995. This was followed by a 1995 comprehensive visit and a 2000 interim report that accredited the college to the present.

In its infancy, the college was named North Central Connecticut Community College. In 1972, the Board of Trustees officially renamed the college "Asnuntuck", Native American for "fresh water", a reference to the Podunk tribe that once resided in the area, to the nearby Connecticut River and Freshwater Brook, and to a strong interest in the environment and ecology.

The college has had three homes in its relatively brief life. It began in the former North School building in the Thompsonville section of Enfield, CT. In 1974, the college moved to a leased warehouse on Phoenix Avenue but gradually outgrew that location. The college moved to its current home in 1983, the former Kosciuszko Junior High School at 170 Elm Street. The years between 1989 and 1994 saw extensive renovations to improve classroom and laboratory space, revamp the auditorium, and add an annex to house the Learning Resource Center.

The college has been an autonomous institution throughout most of its existence, with the exception of a period from 1985 to 1989. During those years, it was part of the Capital Region Community College District with Greater Hartford Community College and Tunxis Community College in Farmington.

In 1992, the Connecticut legislature mandated merging the state's community and technical colleges. While there was no area technical college for an Asnuntuck merger, the legislature also required each community college to complement its general education with a technical focus, bringing about several programmatic changes, as well as the change to the name, Asnuntuck Community-Technical College. The technical focus remains, particularly in a recently established Manufacturing Technology (formerly known as Machine Technology) program, but the state community colleges dropped the word “technical” from their names in 1999, returning to the simpler name, Asnuntuck Community College.

The majority of students focus on completing their studies at Asnuntuck and transferring to a 4-year institution.  Another large percentage of the student population is enrolled in curricula that focus on workforce development. The Manufacturing Technology Center (MTC) prepares students for immediate entry into the workforce.  95% of the MTC students are already employed upon graduation.

In 2016 Asnuntuck received state bond funding for campus improvements. The College was approved to receive $11.4 million for renovations and improvements including replacement of the roof; construction of a new building entrance; and the construction, renovation and improvement of student senate offices, conference areas, lounge, bookstore, a food service area with indoor and outdoor seating, and a community function area.

Location
Asnuntuck Community College in Enfield, Connecticut, is located just off Interstate 91, approximately halfway between the metropolitan areas of Springfield, Massachusetts, to the north and Hartford, Connecticut, to the south. Asnuntuck serves the north-central Connecticut communities of East Granby, East Windsor, Ellington, Enfield, Somers, Stafford Springs, Suffield, and Windsor Locks, and also draws students from south-central Massachusetts and the greater Hartford area.

Academics
Asnuntuck has its own radio station, WACC-LP (107.7 FM) and an on-site welding program.  Many area employers use Asnuntuck to train their workers in sophisticated machine technology, welding and Electro-mechanical technologies. The program has an over 90% placement rate and has recently expanded.  Students can prepare for careers in allied health professions, the insurance and financial industry, and more.  Asnuntuck Community College also has agreements with many four-year institutions, enabling Asnuntuck students who take appropriate courses and maintain the necessary Grade Point Average to enroll without loss of credit in Baccalaureate programs.

The Asnuntuck Community College Foundation, the community's vehicle for philanthropic support of the college, offers many scholarships for new and continuing Asnuntuck students.

First Amendment controversy

Asnuntuck Community College student Nicholas Saucier had a conversation about gun legislation with Connecticut Governor Dannel Malloy. The college charged Saucier with harassment and making threats. When Saucier challenged the charges at an official hearing, the college refused to review the video evidence of the incident; as Saucier video taped without permission.   Saucier was found guilty of all charges and placed on probation after initially being dismissed from the college.  The FIRE wrote a letter in January 2014 asking Asnuntuck Community College to reverse their dismissal of the student and uphold the student's free speech and due process rights. As of April 4, 2014, FIRE had not received any dispute directly from Asnuntuck Community College.

According to Asnuntuck's home page, "Asnuntuck Community College does not discriminate on the basis of race, color, religious creed, age, gender, gender identity or expression, national origin, marital status, ancestry, present or past history of mental disorder, learning disability or physical disability, political belief, veteran status, sexual orientation, genetic information, or criminal record."

References

External links
Official website

Enfield, Connecticut
Community colleges in Connecticut
Educational institutions established in 1972
Universities and colleges in Hartford County, Connecticut
1972 establishments in Connecticut